Bodmiscombe is a village in Devon, England.

External links

Villages in Devon